Ecliptopera dissecta is a moth of the family Geometridae.

References

Moths of Asia
Moths described in 1887